Temple Terrace is an incorporated city in northeastern Hillsborough County, Florida, United States, adjacent to Tampa. As of the 2020 census, the city had a population of 26,690. It is the third and smallest incorporated municipality in Hillsborough County. (Tampa and Plant City are the others.) Incorporated in 1925, the community is known for its rolling landscape, bucolic Hillsborough River views, and majestic trees; it has the grandest sand live oak trees of any place in central Florida and is a Tree City USA. Temple Terrace was originally planned in the 1920s Mediterranean-Revival golf course community and is one of the first such communities in the United States (planned in 1920).

Temple Terrace was named for the then-new hybrid, the Temple orange also called the tangor. It is a cross between the mandarin orange—also called the tangerine—and the common sweet orange; it was named after Florida-born William Chase Temple, one-time owner of the Pittsburgh Pirates, founder of the Temple Cup, and first president of the Florida Citrus Exchange. Temple Terrace was the first place in the United States where the new Temple orange was grown in large quantities. The "terrace" portion of the name refers to the terraced terrain of the area by the river where the city was founded. One of the original houses also had a terraced yard with a lawn sloping, in tiers, toward the river.

History

Pre-Columbian

The original inhabitants of the Temple Terrace area were known as the Tocobaga, a group of Native Americans living around Tampa Bay, both in prehistoric and historic times, until roughly 1760. Their numbers declined in the seventeenth century, due at least in part to diseases brought to the New World by the Europeans, to which they had little natural resistance. All of the Florida tribes were also severely affected by the raids of Creeks and Yamasee during the late stages of the seventeenth century. In any case, the Tocobaga disappeared from history less than a hundred years later.

Spanish exploration

Spanish exploration of the Temple Terrace area dates back to 1757 when explorer Don Francisco Maria Celi of the Spanish Royal Fleet made his way up the Hillsborough River (naming it "El Rio de San Julian y Arriaga") to what is now Riverhills Park in search of pine trees to use as masts for his ships. Here, in the extensive longleaf pine forest, he erected a cross in what he named "El Pinal de la Cruz de Santa Teresa" (the Pine Forest of the Cross of Saint Theresa). Confirmation of the fleet's travels is found in its map and logbook. A historic marker and a replica of the cross erected to honor St. Theresa are found in Riverhills Park today. Up to 1913, the longleaf pine, sand live oak, and cypress trees made the area suitable for turpentine manufacturing and logging.

The Potter Palmer years

The area now known as Temple Terrace was originally part of an exclusive  game preserve called "Riverhills" belonging to Chicago socialite Bertha Palmer, wife of businessman Potter Palmer. She played an extensive role in making Sarasota the "City of the Arts" that it is today. She was one of the largest landholders, ranchers, farmers, and developers in Florida at the turn of the twentieth century. The Evening Independent newspaper in 1918 described the preserve as "a well-stocked hunting preserve north of Tampa being one of the most attractive hunting grounds in the state." Property acquisition by the Palmers and the Honorés began in 1910; only one of the original buildings from the preserve, now known as the Woodmont Clubhouse, remains. Because it escaped logging, the grounds of the clubhouse harbor some of the largest specimens of live oak and longleaf pine in the city.

The Mediterranean Revival golf course community

Mrs. Potter-Palmer's vision for her property was that it be developed into a golf course community surrounded by extensive citrus groves, but her death in 1918 prevented her from fully realizing that vision. At her death, the trustee of her estate and brother, Adrian Honoré, sold her local land holdings to Burks Hamner,  Vance Helm, Maud Fowler, Cody Fowler, and D. Collins Gillett, who formed two development corporations: Temple Terrace Estates, Inc., which developed the golf course and residential areas; and Temple Terraces, Inc., which developed  of orange groves that originally surrounded the city to the west and north, the largest orange grove in the world in the 1920s. (Adrian Honoré retained a seat on the board.) D. Collins Gillett oversaw Temple Terraces, Inc. and owned the first and largest citrus nursery in Florida, Buckeye Nurseries of Tampa. His father, Myron E. Gillett, thirty-first mayor of Tampa, was instrumental in popularizing the exotic hybrid Temple orange in the United States.

The 1920 vision for the community was that wealthy retired Northerners would purchase one of the lots in Temple Terrace, build a Mediterranean Revival villa on the lot and also purchase a parcel in the extensive adjoining citrus grove to either manage as a hobby or provide extra income. Temple Terrace was originally only occupied during "The Season" (which lasted roughly from December to the annual Washington Ball held at the clubhouse on February 22). For the rest of the year, the houses were cared for by caretakers until The Season came again and the homeowners returned.

In 1924, part of the  area platted as the Temple Orange grove and called Temple Terraces, Inc. was developed into the present-day neighborhood of Temple Crest, immediately adjacent to Temple Terrace and its west, hugging the Hillsborough River. The land occupied by nearby Busch Gardens was also part of Mrs. Palmer's original  ranch.

In 1925 and 1926, the Temple Terrace Golf and Country Club (which is still in existence) hosted the Florida Open (in 1925 billed as the "Greatest Field of Golfers ever to Play in Florida"). "Long" Jim Barnes was the resident professional of the course at the time (James Kelly Thomson was the course's first pro), and every major golfer of the day competed in the event except for Bobby Jones. Leo Diegel won the tournament. Jim Barnes' friend Fred McLeod is also associated with the early days of the course. The golf-course architect was Tom Bendelow, who also designed Medinah Country Club's Course #3 in Chicago, a 7,508-yard (7,385 m) golf course that has hosted three U.S. Opens (1949, 1975, 1990) and two PGA Championships (1999, 2006). The golf course of the Temple Terrace Golf and Country Club is virtually unchanged since its design by Bendelow and is eligible for the National Register of Historic Places. It measures 6,414 yards with a par of 72.

Temple Terrace is one of the first planned golf-course communities in the United States (1920). The town plan was created by town planner and landscape architect George F. Young, who also created the plan for nearby Davis Islands (Tampa) and McClelland Park (Sarasota), among others. The architecture was designed in the Mediterranean-Revival style by two different architects in two different periods. The first phase was in 1921 by noted Tampa architect M. Leo Elliott (Centro Asturiano de Tampa and Old Tampa City Hall) designed the initial houses and the public buildings. In 1926 renowned New York architect Dwight James Baum (architect of John Ringling's Cà d'Zan, the Hotel El Verona in Sarasota, and the West Side YMCA in New York City) also designed residences in Temple Terrace.

There are fifteen houses and buildings designed by Elliott remaining in the city, the largest collection of his work anywhere. In addition, there are over 35 houses in the city designed by architect Dwight James Baum, which is thought to be the largest collection of his work in the Southeast.

Temple Terrace struggled through the 1930s like the rest of Florida. Building activity began to pick up again after World War II. There is now a fine collection of mid-century modern homes and buildings, at least two of which were designed by well-known architect Frank Albert DePasquale.

Florida College

Florida Bible Institute bought the old Country Club Clubhouse in the late 1930s from the city for back taxes and remains a cherished part of Florida College. Florida College is now a private liberal arts college (founded in 1946) and occupies some of the community's oldest buildings, including the Temple Terrace Country Club, which is now Sutton Hall. Billy Graham attended Florida Bible Institute, which owned the property now occupied by Florida College, in the late 1930s. In his autobiography, he writes that he received his calling "on the 18th green of the Temple Terrace Golf and Country Club". A Billy Graham Memorial Park is on the east side of the 18th green on the river.

Rejuvenation and redevelopment

Temple Terrace's rebirth took place in 1984–1987 with the appointment of Thomas C. Mortenson as the City's Building and Zoning Director and 1st Community Development Director .  Mortenson, with the assistance of City Engineer Paul Tomasino, and City Attorney Ted Taub, were responsible for the annexation of Telecom Park and numerous areas adjacent to the city, thereby tripling the tax base and doubling the size of the city.  Creating a favorable development environment and working with the Mayor and City Council, the trio worked to attract new businesses, and shopping centers, as well as redevelopment of existing business areas and vastly expanded housing in the community.  Numerous new subdivisions were created during this period giving the city a firm tax base and identity that made Temple Terrace a desirable safe place for raising families, conducting business, and an environmentally sound community .

Temple Terrace is currently in the process of redeveloping  (the southeast quadrant) of its 1960s-era downtown. The goal of the city is to build a mixed-use, medium-density, pedestrian-oriented downtown.

The city hired noted town planner Torti Gallas + Partners in 2004 to create a New Urbanist master plan and redevelopment code for the entire  downtown area (four quadrants of 56th Street and Busch Boulevard), all with citizen input. The city also initiated a form-based code for its downtown, created a façade-improvement grant program, implemented a multi-modal transportation model to encourage alternatives to the automobile, and began revitalizing 56th Street with entry towers, landscaping, street furniture, placing utilities underground, and improved lighting.

The site of the new downtown area is the site of the downtown area that was originally planned in the 1920s but never built because of the Great Depression. Many of the planning concepts and architecture of the redevelopment area are based on the original plan and Temple Terrace's unique 1920s historic Mediterranean Revival architecture.

Neighbors

Many of Temple Terrace's residents teach or work at the nearby University of South Florida, and the close-knit community has strong ties to that institution. (The USF campus was also part of Mrs. Palmer's original  ranch.)

Eureka Springs Park, located to the east of Temple Terrace, is Hillsborough County's only botanical garden. The  park was started by Russian immigrant and amateur horticulturalist Albert Greenberg, who donated his park to the county in 1967. Poet Robert Frost and other famous personalities made it a point to visit Greenberg in the years before World War II.

The Museum of Science & Industry, commonly called MOSI, is located in Tampa near the Temple Terrace city line.

Sitting just one mile to the west of Temple Terrace is Busch Gardens Tampa.

Geography

Temple Terrace is located in north-central Hillsborough County at  (28.041546, –82.382519). The city is bounded by Tampa to the west and north, Del Rio to the south, and rural Hillsborough County, near Interstate 75, to the east.

The Hillsborough River flows through the eastern and southern parts of the city and forms some of its southern boundary.

Demographics

As of the census of 2010, there were 24,541 people living in the city. The racial makeup of the city was 68.04% White, 19.53% Black, 0.07% Native American, 5.45% Asian, 0.04% Pacific Islander, 3.30% from other races, and 3.17% from two or more races. Hispanic or Latino of any race were 14.66% of the population.

Per city data, 90.5% of the population has a high school degree or higher. 43.5% of the population has a bachelor's degree or higher. 17.3% of the population has a graduate or professional degree. These are the highest education percentages of any municipality in Florida.

There were 8,671 households, out of which 27.9% had children under the age of 18 living with them, 46.9% were married couples living together, 11.4% had a female householder with no husband present, and 38.3% were non-families. 28.9% of all households were made up of individuals, and 8.3% had someone living alone who was 65 years of age or older.  The average household size was 2.36 and the average family size was 2.95.

In the city, the population was spread out, with 22.2% under the age of 18, 12.4% from 18 to 24, 29.9% from 25 to 44, 23.5% from 45 to 64, and 11.9% who were 65 years of age or older.  The median age was 35 years. For every 100 females, there were 91.4 males.  For every 100 females age 18 and over, there were 87.2 males.

The median income for a household in the city was $44,508, and the median income for a family was $56,809. Males had a median income of $38,384 versus $32,107 for females. The per capita income for the city was $26,515.  About 5.4% of families and 7.2% of the population were below the poverty line, including 5.8% of those under age 18 and 8.9% of those age 65 or over.

Notable people

 Pam Bondi, 37th Florida Attorney General
 Sammy Ellis, professional baseball pitcher
 Cody Fowler, prominent Florida attorney and former President of the American Bar Association
 Napoleon Hill, motivational author and speaker
 Peter Palmer, actor
 Colonel Tom Parker, Elvis Presley's manager
 Robin Roberts, Hall of Fame baseball pitcher (Philadelphia Phillies)

Education

Temple Terrace Elementary
Riverhills Elementary
Lewis Elementary
Terrace Community Middle School
Angelo L. Greco Middle School
C. Leon King High School
Dr. Kiran C. Patel High School
Florida College Academy (private school)
Temple Terrace Presbyterian Weekday School
Corpus Christi Catholic School
Florida College

Library

The Temple Terrace Public Library is located at 202 Bullard Parkway in the City of Temple Terrace and is part of the Hillsborough County Public Library Cooperative (HCPLC).

History 

The Temple Terrace Library was established in 1959 by the Temple Terrace Women's Club. The doors officially opened on January 15, 1960 after pursuing a collection of enough donations to facilitate a small library for the community. It was originally run by volunteers of the Women's Club and was located in a small house. As demand grew, they relocated to a City Hall building in April 1961, which is now part of Florida College. The library shortly outgrew this too as they built their collection and by 1965 they needed a new building and a larger overall operation which included appointing a Library Board which was run by the city. They broke ground in September of that year and opened in April of 1966. The Women's Club remained involved and provided the money for the library's service desk. By the mid-70's they were running out of space and added 5,600 square feet which enlarged the structure by April 1978. On February 18, 1982 tragedy ensued when a fire was set by an arsonist. The library lost a devastating 11,666 books and 1,010 recordings. The Women's Club stepped in again and helped restore the building which then opened a year after the fire. In the meantime, they relocated materials to the Lightfoot Recreation Center to keep the library going. In 1997 the library was once again renovated for expansion which brought the library to 20,000 square feet. It reopened in March 1998 with an online catalog, computers, and internet access which is largely how it is utilized to this day with a collection of over 100,000 volumes and 52 community computers.

Services 

Services include a standard book, eBook, CD, and DVD checkout. There is access to computers, Wi-Fi, and other technologies as well as regular and 3D printing. There are meeting and study rooms, safe areas for children, and a Book Nook provided by the local Friends of the Temple Terrace Library organization. There are programs for children, teens, and adults which include activities and resources for certain age groups and developmental levels ranging from storytime to crafts and appropriate games. The library also offers many resources beyond books such as sewing machines, cooking items, tools, board games, and neckties to borrow for various reasons. You can even "check out" a limited number of seed packets each month that does not have to be returned and come with instructions on how to take care of them. These are all resources that have been proven to be successful in the local community to help provide items that may only occasionally be needed. Partnering up with the University of South Florida Special & Digital Collections and Tampa-Hillsborough County Libraries, the Temple Terrace Library has also been able to provide access to archives of the local newspapers, the Temple Terrace Beacon and Temple Terrace Sentinel.

Sister cities

Temple Terrace has a sister city:
 Eastleigh, England, in the United Kingdom since 1989

References

Further reading

External links
 City of Temple Terrace official website

Cities in Hillsborough County, Florida
Cities in Florida
1920 establishments in Florida